Millwood Public Schools is a PK-12 district with an enrollment of approximately 1035 students in Oklahoma City, Oklahoma. The student body is primarily made up of African-American students (98%). Two schools, an arts academy, a ninth grade academy, a pre-school program and two community learning centers are maintained within the district. 
  
The ad-valorem tax base is primarily residential property and the land surrounding Remington Park, which contains such non-taxable properties as the National Cowboy and Western Heritage Museum, the Oklahoma City Zoo, the Omniplex Science Museum, the National Softball Hall of Fame, the Oklahoma State Firefighter Museum, and the land on which Remington Park is built.

History 
A map discovered in 1987, dated June 8, 1900, is marked "Territory of Oklahoma, Oklahoma County, District 37," and is drawn with the current Millwood district boundaries. The land was purchased by a firm from South Carolina, which planned to build a cotton mill on the site along with homes and a school for mill workers, but the entire project was later dropped. The only work completed  plotted for a housing project and the one-room school house historically known as Deep Fork School.

In 1918, the school board traded the original site for another  tract (which is located near the present spot of the Millwood Middle School Building) and a new three-room, two-story rock building was built. In 1935, with WPA labor, a large two-story rock building was built, complete with a principal's office, classrooms, cafeteria, and auditorium. Kindergarten was started in 1949 on a tuition basis, and in 1951, kindergarten was included in the regular school program.  In 1956 Millwood consisted of Kindergarten through 8th grade with about 25 students in each grade.  Like a lot of schools in those days, Millwood was segregated with an all white faculty and students until 1963-64.  By 1962 attendance had more than doubled, and the school was an athletic power even back then.  From 1960 to 1962 the basketball team was undefeated for three seasons, dominating conference members Pleasant Hill, Crutcho, Harrison and others and in 1962 defeated Casady's 8th grade team twice. In 1960 a new building which included 11 classrooms, library, new offices, kitchen, lounge, and cafeteria, was added at a cost of $275,000. Six new 72-passenger buses were  purchased in 1963, along with a plan to expand the existing facilities and to add a ninth grade.  The curriculum required additional facilities, including a home economics room, drafting and manual arts room, and two classrooms.

During the spring of 1971, a special election was held for the purpose of establishing an independent school district with the addition of a new high school for grades 10-12. The high school was accredited the year of operation and held its first graduation in 1972 with 16 students.

Recent developments

A preschool program was added in 1980, and computer education programs were added in 1982. A pre-kindergarten program was added to the primary school in 1995.  In 1996, the fifth grade was moved from the middle school to the primary school, which was then changed to an elementary school with grades pre-kindergarten through five.  The sixth grade was moved from the middle school in the fall of 2002.

The Millwood Elementary School Arts Academy (MESAA) opened for the 2003-2004 school year.  Parents and staff participated in the development of this academy, designed to offer an intense, integrated arts curriculum with opportunities in the areas of drama, vocal/instrumental music, visual arts and dance.  Admission to MESAA is through an application process.

In the school year of 2006-2007, the arts academy reformed the middle school cheerleading squad.

Noted alumni 

 Joe Carter – professional major league baseball player for the Toronto Blue Jays
 Susie Berning – professional golfer
 Ellis Edwards – former Oklahoma State Treasurer
 Vonley R Royal - Oklahoma State Regents for Higher Education Chief Information Officer
 Kevin Samuels - YouTuber 
 Kanye West's 1st Cousin - "Recording Artist" Anthony Williams
 Bryan White - Grammy, CMA, ACM award-winning multiplatinum country music artist
 Marcus Major - Running back, University of Oklahoma, and the real RB1

References

External links
 Millwood Public Schools website

Education in Oklahoma City
School districts in Oklahoma